Marc Howard (born February 13, 1937) is a retired longtime Philadelphia news anchor. He last anchored at KYW-TV beginning in 2003 when he fronted the late newscasts, but soon only anchored the 4 p.m. news.

Howard's television career began at WFMJ-TV in Youngstown, Ohio. One of Howard's duties was hosting a late afternoon movie program called Showtime. While the program initially followed a mainstream movie format, during the Monster Craze of the 1960s, the program almost exclusively featured horror and sci-fi movies Monday through Friday. As host, Howard did not appear as a horror host character but as himself. He moved to New York City in 1967 as one of the original members of WNEW-TV's Ten O'Clock News team.  After a brief reporting stint at WPRI-TV in Providence, Rhode Island, Howard returned to New York as a reporter for WPIX in 1968, staying there until 1970 when he took a job as press secretary to Howard J. Samuels during his unsuccessful run for Governor of New York; he later returned to WPIX as a political reporter.

Howard moved to Hartford, Connecticut, to work for WFSB as a reporter and weekend anchor, and then arrived in Philadelphia in 1977 to become the 5:30 p.m. co-anchor of WPVI's Action News; the newscast would expand to an hour in 1981.  Howard would work at Action News alongside the Jim O'Brien and later forming a long-running partnership with Lisa Thomas-Laury beginning in 1983.

In late 2002, he left after being hired at KYW-TV to replace Larry Kane on the 11 P.M. newscast. In addition to his anchoring duties, Howard also hosted the locally produced public affairs program Newsmakers, which focuses on a variety of political issues, both local and national, and airs on KYW-TV on Sunday mornings.

He retired from anchoring on November 30, 2007, ending a broadcasting career that began at  WPIC 790 am in his hometown of Sharon, Pennsylvania.

Notes

1937 births
Television anchors from Philadelphia
Philadelphia television reporters
Living people
People from Mercer County, Pennsylvania
Journalists from Pennsylvania